The Kolombangara white-eye or hermit white-eye (Zosterops murphyi) is a species of bird in the family Zosteropidae. It is endemic to the Solomon Islands.

References

Kolombangara white-eye
Birds of Kolombangara
Kolombangara white-eye
Taxonomy articles created by Polbot